The Beaver River is a river in the far northeast of Kenora District in Northwestern Ontario, Canada. It is part of the James Bay drainage basin, and is a left tributary of the Kapiskau River.

Course
The river begins at an unnamed lake and first heads north, then southeast. It then turns northeast, and reaches its mouth at the Kapiskau River, which flows to James Bay.

References

Sources

Rivers of Kenora District